Karin Larsson (born 16 July 1976) is a Swedish archer. Larsson competed in the women's individual and team events at the 2000 Summer Olympics.

References

External links
 

1976 births
Living people
Swedish female archers
Olympic archers of Sweden
Archers at the 2000 Summer Olympics
People from Sandviken Municipality
Sportspeople from Gävleborg County
20th-century Swedish women